Zaid Krouch is a Moroccan professional footballer who plays as a midfielder for Moghreb Tétouan in Botola.

International career
In January 2014, coach Hassan Benabicha, invited him to be a part of the Morocca squad for the 2014 African Nations Championship. He helped the team to top group B after drawing with Burkina Faso and Zimbabwe and defeating Uganda. The team was eliminated from the competition at the quarter final zone after losing to Nigeria.

Honours

Club 
FC Goa
Indian Super Cup(1):2019

RS Berkane
CAF Confederation Cup: 2020

References

1991 births
Living people
Moroccan footballers
Morocco A' international footballers
2014 African Nations Championship players
Moghreb Tétouan players
Indian Super League players
FC Goa players
Moroccan expatriate footballers
Expatriate footballers in India
Association football midfielders
Moroccan expatriate sportspeople in India